La Trinité National Nature Reserve (French: Réserve naturelle nationale de la Trinité) is a French nature reserve in French Guiana created in 1996. It protects  of tropical rainforest in the communes of Mana and Saint-Élie.

Overview
La Trinité was created in 1996, because it is an isolated forest, and no gold mining activities had taken place in the area. The reserve contains mountain forests, plain forest and rock savannas. The reserve contains mountain ranges with tepuis.

In la Trinité more than 57 mammal species have been identified, and more than 300 bird species. In 2011, a new species of Eulepidotis was discovered on Roche Bénitier in the reserve.

References

External links
Official site (in French)

Environment of French Guiana
Mana, French Guiana
Nature reserves in France
Protected areas established in 1995
Protected areas of French Guiana
Saint-Élie